SWIP, SWiP or Swip can refer to:

Scottish Widows Investment Partnership
Shared Whois Project
Society for Women in Philosophy
Swiss Innovation Pool Inc.